Juan Soriano may refer to:
Juan Soriano (artist) (1920–2006), Mexican artist
Juan Manuel Soriano (1920–1995), Spanish voice actor
Juan Soriano (footballer) (born 1997), Spanish footballer

See also
Joan Soriano (born 1972), Dominican musician